Yekutiel "Kuti" Adam (November 3, 1927 – June 10, 1982) was an Israeli general and former Deputy Chief of Staff of the Israel Defense Forces.

Biography
He was born in Tel Aviv to Yehuda and Elisheva Adam (formerly Adamov). He was named after his grandfather, Yekutiel Ravayev, who was killed in combat defending Petah Tikva from Arabs in 1916. His family were Mountain Jews from the Caucasus region.

At the age of 15, Yekutiel joined the Haganah. At 20, he became a commander.

On May 1, 1948, he was one of the commanders who captured the Palestinian village Salame, to the south of Tel Aviv. He later joined an elite Haganah unit that conducted raids into enemy territory.

In March, 1950, Adam married and built a house in Tel Aviv. At that time, he became an officer in the IDF, with the rank of lieutenant. Adam rose quickly through the ranks. In 1952, he became a captain in the Givati Brigade. Then he went on to command the Be'er Sheva bloc as a lieutenant colonel.

He went on to study in the war academy in France in 1964-66 and returned to assume the rank of colonel. In the Six-Day War, he served under Ariel Sharon, proving his worth. Following the war, he became commander of the Golani Brigade. The Golani Brigade was responsible for keeping the peace in the north during the War of Attrition. During this time, Adam was promoted to brigadier general and served as the vice commander of the IDF's Northern Command until the end of the Yom Kippur War.

In 1974, Adam was moved to the Sinai, where he became a major general and eventually went on to head the Southern Command.

He was the commander of the Operation Entebbe, the 1976 raid at Entebbe airport in Uganda.

In 1978, he went to the United States to study and returned to become the Deputy Chief of Staff, under Rafael Eitan, and head of the Directorate of Operations.

In 1982, Adam went to the United States again to study, this time in Berkeley, but came back to Israel after Prime Minister Menachem Begin announced Adam's appointment to as head of the Mossad, in replacement of Yitzhak Hofi.

He was killed in the 1982 Lebanon War before he could take up his post. On June 10 of that year, the fourth day of the war, Adam and a group of Israeli officers were commanding operations from an appropriated villa in Dawha near the town of Damour some 12 kilometers south of Beirut. When the area was shelled by enemy mortars, Adam and two other officers descended to the basement to take cover. A Palestinian fighter, who was hiding there, opened fire killing Adam and fatally wounding Col. Chaim Sela. Yekutiel Adam was deputy Chief of Staff and thus the highest ranking IDF officer ever to be killed in battle. The identity of Adam's killer was never clarified. Some sources identify him as a Palestinian minor. An IDF medic who served in an Israeli military prison during the war witnessed an officer point to a 15-year-old boy among a group of prisoners and said: "You see this boy? He murdered the late Yekutiel Adam".

Yekutiel Adam was buried in Kiryat Shaul cemetery, Tel Aviv. A street was named after him in Ashkelon, and a main road in North Jerusalem. The Israeli Institute of Technology has named the Adam Yekutiel soil-machine laboratory after him.

His son Udi Adam has followed in his father's footsteps becoming a Major General in the Israel Defense Forces and later was appointed chief of Northern Command.

The IDF base called Adam Facility (Mitkan Adam), home to the Israeli Counter Terror School and other training facilities for Sayarot, shooting and sniping is named after Yekutiel Adam.

References

 Victor Ostrovsky, The Other Side of Deception, Chapter 8, pp. 55–56.

Further reading
Michael Oren, Six Days of War (Oxford, 2002), pp. 182, 212.

1927 births
1982 deaths
Jews in Mandatory Palestine
Israeli Mizrahi Jews
Israeli generals
People from Tel Aviv
Israeli military personnel killed in action
Israeli people of Mountain Jewish descent
Assassinated military personnel
Burials at Kiryat Shaul Cemetery